The Best News Presenter is an award presented annually at the Star Awards, a ceremony that was established in 1994.

The category was introduced in 2010, at the 16th Star Awards ceremony. It was introduced as a result of the discontinuation of the Best News/Current Affairs Presenter award to create distinctions news and current affairs presenters.

The award is given in honour of a Mediacorp presenter who has delivered an outstanding performance in a news programme. The nominees are determined by a team of judges employed by Mediacorp; winners are selected by a majority vote from the entire judging panel. 

Since its inception, the award has been given to four presenters. Zhao Wenbei is the inaugural and most recent winner in this category, and also the only presenter to win in this category twice since the ceremony held in 2013. In addition, Lin Chi Yuan, Tung Soo Hua, Zhang Haijie, and Zhao have been nominated on four occasions, more than any other presenter. Wang Zheng holds the record for the most nominations without a win, with two.

The award is currently being suspended and has not been presented since 2014 due to the lack of eligible nominees, as well as widespread public controversy over the credibility of the judging process in view of various unconvincing wins which saw Tung Soo Hua taking home the award over consecutive years.

Recipients

 Each year is linked to the article about the Star Awards held that year.

Category facts

Most wins

Most nominations

References

External links 

Star Awards